The Diesbach family were a patrician family, originally from the Swiss canton of Bern, with branches in the canton of Fribourg and in France.

External links
 

Swiss noble families